Crepitation refers to situations where noises are produced by the rubbing of parts one against the other, as in:
 Crepitus, a crunching sensation felt in certain medical problems
 Rales or crackles, abnormal sounds heard over the lungs with a stethoscope
 A mechanism of sound production in grasshoppers during flight.  Also called "wing snapping".

Causes of Crepitations:
1.Pulmonary oedema***
2.Resolving pneumonia
3.Bronchiactesis
4.Lung abscess
5.Diffuse parenchymal lung disease